Piper retrofractum, the Balinese long pepper or Javanese long pepper, is a flowering vine in the family Piperaceae, cultivated for its fruit, which is usually dried and used as a spice and seasoning. The fruit of Piper retrofractum is similar in appearance and taste to that of the Indian long pepper (P. longum).

Names 
In Cambodia, it is known as  dei-phlei and in Thailand as  deebplee. In the Malay Archipelago, the fruit is once known as cabai until the popularity of the chilli introduced from the New World by European traders superseded it in culinary popularity causing a semantic shift referring to the new crop while the old plant became cabai jawa.

Botany 
The plant is a climbing vine with stems of about 3–4 mm in diameter. Its leaves have blades that are glabrous, lanceolate, with acuminate apex and asymmetric base, and are about 10–12 cm long and 3–3.5 cm wide. The vine has been described as dioecious or monoecious, with male spikes of about 5 cm long and female spikes about 4 cm long and 0.5–1 cm wide, and part of the ovaries are attached on the axis. Its berries are spherical and arranged densely on the axis.

References

External links
 Plants Profile for Piper retrofractum (Javanese long pepper)

retrofractum